The Cupan languages is a branch of the Uto-Aztecan language family that comprises Cupeño, Ivilyuat (Cahuilla), Luiseño-Juaneño, and perhaps Nicoleño, all historically spoken in southern California. 

The branch had long been considered to be part of the Takic subgroup, but there is doubt about the validity of Takic as a genetic unit, the similarities between the languages classed as Takic possibly being due primarily to borrowing.

Languages and dialects 

 Luiseño-Juaneño language
 Luiseño dialect cluster
 Juaneño dialect  †
 Ivilyuat (also known as Cahuilla)
 Mountain Cahuilla dialect
 Pass Cahuilla dialect (also known as Wanikik)  †
 Desert Cahuilla dialect
 Cupeño  †
 Cupa dialect  †
 Wilaqalpa dialect  †
 Paluqla dialect  †

(†) – Extinct language

References

Northern Uto-Aztecan languages
Indigenous languages of California